John Sparks is an Australian former professional rugby league footballer who played in the 1980s.  Sparks was a foundation player for Illawarra playing in the club's first game.

Playing career
Sparks made his first grade debut for Balmain in Round 4 1981 against Canterbury at Leichhardt Oval with the match finishing in a 52–13 loss.

Balmain went on to finish with the wooden spoon after coming last in 1981 and was one of only four times that the foundation club would ever come last in its entire history.

In 1982, Sparks joined newly admitted Illawarra and played in the club's first ever game which was against Penrith at WIN Stadium and ended in a 17–7 loss.  Sparks finished as the club's joint top try scorer in its inaugural year with 13 tries.

Sparks played 2 more seasons with Illawarra before retiring at the end of 1984.

References

1962 births
Living people
Balmain Tigers players
Illawarra Steelers players
Australian rugby league players
Rugby league centres
Rugby league fullbacks
Rugby league players from Sydney